A public-sector trade union (or public-sector labor union) is a trade union which primarily represents the interests of employees within public sector or governmental organizations.

History and recent developments

Costa Rica

In the late 1800s, trade unions first appeared to support workers in a variety of urban and industrial jobs. After facing violent repression, such as during the 1934 United Fruit Strike, unions gained more power following the 1948 Costa Rican Civil War, and public sector unions appeared. Previous administrations and assesmblies paid very little attention to Costa Rica's trade unions;, however when the Luis Guillermo Solís and the 2014 legislative assembly took office, Solís and eight members of the Citizens' Action Party and Broad Front promised to listen to unions. Libertarian Otto Guevara expressed concern. Today, Costa Rican unions are strongest in the public sector, including the fields of education and medicine. There is also a strong presence in agricultural sectors for unions. In general, Costa Rican unions support government regulation of the banking, medical, and education fields, as well as improved wages and working conditions.

One important issue for public sector unions is passage of the Código Procesal Laboral (Procedural Labor Law), which former president Laura Chinchilla vetoed. If passed, Chinchilla said it would allow emergency service workers, such as police, medical service staff and doctors to strike. President Luis Guillermo Solís said that the issue of the Procedural Labor Law should be finalized within his first year in office. Legislative Assembly president Henry Mora Jiménez, also supported the law, as do the public sector unions.

Europe
There are public-sector trade unions in Europe that negotiate agreements between public employees and the institutions for which they work. In 2010, severe financial crises forced several governments to cut back on wages and benefits in austerity measures, leading to protests, most notably in Greece. In Greece, a one-day protest was held because of requirements placed by the EU on Greece's public spending.

United States

Labor unions generally bypassed government employees because they were controlled mostly by the patronage system used by the political parties before the arrival of civil service. 
Post Office workers did form unions. The National Association of Letter Carriers started in 1889 and grew quickly. By the mid-1960s it had 175,000 members in 6,400 local branches.

Several competing organizations of postal clerks emerged starting in the 1890s. Merger discussions dragged on for years, until finally the NFPOC, UNMAPOC and others merged in 1961 as the United Federation of Postal Clerks.  Another round of mergers in 1971 produced the American Postal Workers Union (APWU).  In 2012 the APWU had 330,000 members.  The various postal unions did not engage in strikes.

Historian Joseph Slater, says, "Unfortunately for public sector unions, the most searing and enduring image of their history in the first half of the twentieth century was the Boston police strike. The strike was routinely cited by courts and officials through the end of the 1940s."<ref>Joseph Slater, "The Boston Police Strike in Aaron Brenner et al. eds. The Encyclopedia of Strikes in American History (2011) </ref>  Governor Calvin Coolidge broke the strike and the legislature took control of the police away from city officials.

The police strike chilled union interest in the public sector in the 1920s. The major exception was the emergence of unions of public school teachers in the largest cities; they formed the American Federation of Teachers (AFT), affiliated with the AFL.  In suburbs and small cities, the National Education Association (NEA) became active, but it insisted it was not a labor union but a professional organization.

New Deal era

In the mid 1930s efforts were made to unionize  WPA workers, but were opposed by President Franklin D. Roosevelt.  Moe points out that Roosevelt, "an ardent supporter of collective bargaining in the private sector, was opposed to it in the public sector."  Roosevelt in 1937 told the nation what the position of his government was: "All Government employees should realize that the process of collective bargaining, as usually understood, cannot be transplanted into the public service.... The very nature and purposes of government make it impossible for administrative officials to represent fully or to bind the employer in mutual discussions with government employee organizations.

"Little New Deal" era
Change came in the 1950s. In 1958 New York mayor Robert Wagner, Jr. issued an executive order, called  "the little Wagner Act," giving city employees certain bargaining rights, and gave their unions with exclusive representation (that is, the unions alone were legally authorized to speak for all city workers, regardless of whether or not some workers were members.)  Management complained but the unions had power in city politics.

By the 1960s and 1970s public-sector unions expanded rapidly to cover teachers, clerks, firemen, police, prison guards and others. In 1962, President John F. Kennedy issued Executive Order 10988, upgrading the status of unions of federal workers.

Recent years
After 1960 public sector unions grew rapidly and secured good wages and high pensions for their members. While manufacturing and farming steadily declined, state- and local-government employment quadrupled from 4 million workers in 1950 to 12 million in 1976 and 16.6 million in 2009.

In 2009 the U.S. membership of public sector unions surpassed membership of private sector unions for the first time, at 7.9m and 7.4m respectively.

In 2011 states faced a growing fiscal crisis and the Republicans had made major gains in the 2010 elections. Public sector unions came under heavy attack especially in Wisconsin, as well as Indiana, New Jersey and Ohio from conservative Republican legislatures.see "Public employees" 2012 update. Conservative state legislatures tried to drastically reduce the abilities of unions to collectively bargain.  Conservatives argued that public unions were too powerful since they helped elect their bosses, and that overly generous pension systems were too heavy a drain on state budgets.

See also
 International comparisons of labor unions
 Public-sector trade unions in the United States

References

Further reading
 Bach, Stephen, et al., eds. Public service employment relations in Europe: transformation, modernization or inertia? (Routledge, 2005)
 Carter, Bob, and Peter Fairbrother. "The transformation of British public-sector industrial relations: from ‘model employer’to marketized relations." Historical Studies in Industrial Relations 7 (1999): 119-146.
 Cheung, Anthony, and Ian Scott, eds. Governance and Public Sector Reform in Asia: Paradigm Shift or Business as Usual? (Routledge, 2012)
 Garrett, Geoffrey, and Christopher Way. "Public sector unions, corporatism, and macroeconomic performance." Comparative Political Studies 32.4 (1999): 411-434.
 Gregory, Robert G., and Jeff Borland. "Recent developments in public sector labor markets" in Handbook of labor economics 3 (1999): 3573-3630.
 Lamo, Ana, Javier J. Pérez, and Ludger Schuknecht. "Public or Private Sector Wage Leadership? An International Perspective," Scandinavian Journal of Economics 114.1 (2012): 228-244. online
 Lucifora, Claudio, and Dominique Meurs. "The public sector pay gap in France, Great Britain and Italy." Review of Income and Wealth 52.1 (2006): 43-59.
 Terry, Mike, ed. Redefining Public Sector Unionism: UNISON and the future of trade unions Routledge, 2012.
 Visser, Jelle. "Union membership statistics in 24 countries." Monthly Labor Review'' 129 (2006): 38.

Trade unions
Labor relations